One Dream is a 2012 Korean-language song by BoA, No.34 in Korea

One Dream may also refer to:
One Dream (Ernie Smith song), 1971 No.1 hit in Jamaica
"One Dream", Sarah McLachlan song written for the Vancouver Winter Olympics on Laws of Illusion
"One Dream", song by Lee Ann Womack from Lee Ann Womack discography for the Tom Sawyer soundtrack
"One Dream", song by Bruce Turgon song for the film Highlander II: The Quickening soundtrack
"One Dream", song by Slim Whitman	1966